Gaytime TV is a late night gay-themed comedy and lifestyle magazine programme and broadcast on BBC 2 in the United Kingdom. It was the first regular BBC television programme to directly address the gay and lesbian community, and won praise from the Daily Mail in May 1996 for its "lightness of touch that other minority interest magazines would do well to emulate".

The series was first hosted by Rhona Cameron, and Bert Tyler-Moore, with Richard Fairbrass later replacing Tyler-Moore. The first programme was broadcast on 29 June 1995, and was last broadcast on 27 July 1999. It was a Planet 24 production. Segments included a weekly workout with porn star Mark Anthony, and one of the programme's traditions was to conclude with a torch song.

References

External links 
 
  Reprint of Gay Times article
 Gay TV: as in lively, bright, playful, merry  – The Independent

1995 British television series debuts
1999 British television series endings
1990s British comedy television series
BBC Television shows
1990s British LGBT-related television series
English-language television shows